Dehydration is the excessive loss of body water. It is sometimes caused by insufficient water intake that could lead to it.

Dehydration or water loss may also refer to other cases of water loss/removal (sometimes colloquially):
Drying, the removal of water through chemical or physical means
Desiccation, sometimes synonymous with drying, sometimes an extreme form of it
Food drying, food preservation by dehydration 
Dehydration reaction, a chemical reaction
Dryness (medical) of skin, etc.